Banisia is a genus of moths of the family Thyrididae.

Species
Some species of this genus are:

Banisia aldabrana 	(Fryer, 1912)
Banisia antiopa 	(Viette, 1954)
Banisia apicale 	(Fryer, 1912) 
Banisia clathrula 	(Guenée, 1877)
Banisia fuliginea 	(Whalley, 1971)
Banisia furva  (Warren, 1905)
Banisia inoptata 	(Whalley, 1971)
Banisia joccatia 	(Whalley, 1971)	
Banisia myrtaea  (Drury, 1773)
Banisia myrsusalis 	(Walker, 1859)
Banisia tibiale 	(Fryer, 1912)
Banisia zamia 	(Whalley, 1971)

References

External links

Thyrididae
Moth genera